

Offseason 
 February 1905: Branch Rickey was traded by the White Sox to the Browns for a player to be named later. The Browns completed the deal by sending Frank Roth to the White Sox in June.

Regular season 
 July 1, 1905: Frank Owen became the first pitcher in the history of the American League to have two complete game victories on the same day. On September 26, teammate Ed Walsh would match the feat.

Season standings

Record vs. opponents

Roster

Player stats

Batting

Starters by position 
Note: Pos = Position; G = Games played; AB = At bats; H = Hits; Avg. = Batting average; HR = Home runs; RBI = Runs batted in

Other batters 
Note: G = Games played; AB = At bats; H = Hits; Avg. = Batting average; HR = Home runs; RBI = Runs batted in

Pitching

Starting pitchers 
Note: G = Games pitched; IP = Innings pitched; W = Wins; L = Losses; ERA = Earned run average; SO = Strikeouts

Other pitchers 
Note: G = Games pitched; IP = Innings pitched; W = Wins; L = Losses; ERA = Earned run average; SO = Strikeouts

Notes

References 
1905 Chicago White Sox team page at Baseball Reference
Chicago White Sox team page at www.baseball-almanac.com

Chicago White Sox seasons
Chicago White Sox season
Chicago White Sox